Alexander Louis Cooper (born August 5, 1963, in Marion, South Carolina) is a former American football linebacker in the National Football League. He played in the NFL from 1985–1993, mainly for the Kansas City Chiefs. He played college football at Western Carolina University.

References 

1963 births
Living people
People from Marion, South Carolina
American football linebackers
Western Carolina University alumni
Western Carolina Catamounts football players
Kansas City Chiefs players
Miami Dolphins players
Philadelphia Eagles players